The 19th World Science Fiction Convention (Worldcon), also known as Seacon, was held on 2–4 September 1961 at the Hyatt House Hotel in Seattle, Washington, United States.

The convention chair was Wally Weber.

Participants 

Attendance was approximately 270 to 300.

Guests of Honor 

 Robert A. Heinlein
 Harlan Ellison (toastmaster)

Heinlein gave a speech titled "The Future Revisited". He was previously the guest of honor at the 3rd Worldcon, and would again be the guest of honor at the 34th Worldcon.

Awards

1961 Hugo Awards 

 Best Novel: A Canticle for Leibowitz by Walter M. Miller, Jr. [J. B. Lippincott, 1959]
 Best Short Story: "The Longest Voyage" by Poul Anderson [Analog Dec 1960]
 Best Dramatic Presentation: The Twilight Zone (TV series) by Rod Serling [CBS]
 Best Professional Magazine: Astounding/Analog edited by John W. Campbell, Jr.
 Best Professional Artist: Ed Emshwiller
 Best Fanzine: Who Killed Science Fiction?, one-shot, edited by Earl Kemp

See also 

 Hugo Award
 Science fiction
 Speculative fiction
 World Science Fiction Society
 Worldcon

References

External links 

 World Science Fiction Society

1960s in Seattle
1961 conferences
1961 in Washington (state)
1961 in the United States
Science fiction conventions in the United States
Seattle Area conventions
Worldcon